Wellington Regional Stadium (known commercially as Sky Stadium through naming rights) is a major sporting venue in Wellington, New Zealand.

It was built on reclaimed railway land, which was surplus to requirements.

The stadium also serves as a large-capacity venue for concerts and is known colloquially as "The Cake Tin".

History
The stadium was built in 1999 by Fletcher Construction and was the first bowl stadium built in New Zealand. It was built to replace Athletic Park, which was no longer considered adequate for international events due to its location and state of disrepair. The stadium was also built to provide a larger-capacity venue for One Day International cricket matches, due to the Basin Reserve ground losing such matches to larger stadiums in other parts of the country.

Naming rights
Westpac Trust, later known as just Westpac, signed on to be the naming sponsor for the stadium when it opened in 2000. Continuing that relationship for twenty years before it ended on 31 December 2019.

On 22 August 2019, it was announced that Sky had signed a six-year agreement to take over as the naming sponsor of the stadium from 1 January 2020.

Tenants

The stadium is a multi-purpose facility, though used mainly for sporting events. It is the home of the Wellington Lions Mitre 10 Cup rugby team and the Hurricanes Super Rugby team. The stadium also hosted the Wellington Sevens, one of the events that was part of the annual World Rugby Sevens Series for national rugby sevens teams. Sky Stadium regularly serves as a home venue for All Blacks rugby matches.

Sky Stadium is also the home venue for A-League team Wellington Phoenix FC, the stadium often referred to as "The Ring of Fire" by Phoenix supporters. It also serves as a major home venue for the New Zealand national football team (the All Whites), notably hosting the home leg of their 2010 FIFA World Cup qualification match against Bahrain.

During the summer the stadium generally hosts international and occasionally domestic limited overs cricket, with the home team being the New Zealand Black Caps for the international contests and Wellington Firebirds for the domestic competition.

The stadium has also been used for rugby league matches, including national team fixtures and New Zealand Warriors away fixtures. The St Kilda Football Club, an Australian rules football club in the Australian Football League (AFL), played home games on Anzac Day at the venue from 2013-15.

Off-field facilities built into the stadium also included the New Zealand Institute of Sport, and a campus for the Wellington School of Cricket, run by the Wellington Cricket Association.

Wellington Phoenix Women has confirmed they will play the majority of their home games at Sky Stadium for the 2022-23 A-League Women season, after their inaugural season was based in Wollongong, Australia due to the COVID-19 pandemic in Australia.

Events

In 2000, the then-Westpac Stadium hosted the Edinburgh Military Tattoo. This was the first time the event was hosted outside Edinburgh, Scotland. They returned to Wellington to play at the stadium again in February 2016.

In 2002, during an England versus Black Caps cricket match, director Peter Jackson recorded 30,000 fans chanting in Black Speech for the sound of 10,000 chanting Uruk-hai during the Battle of Helm's Deep in the film The Lord of the Rings: The Two Towers.

On 4 March 2006, WWE's first New Zealand show, WWE SmackDown Road to WrestleMania 22 Tour, was held at the stadium. 23,875 people attended the televised event. There were nine matches, including a triple threat match between Kurt Angle, The Undertaker, and Mark Henry for the World Heavyweight Championship (WWE)

Also in 2006, a concert was held by The Rolling Stones, which ended the Australasian leg of its A Bigger Bang World Tour,

On 14 October 2007, Australia defeated New Zealand in the Centenary Test rugby league game. The 58–0 defeat set a new record for the largest loss by the New Zealand national rugby league team.

On 1 December 2007, the stadium hosted an exhibition match between Wellington Phoenix FC and Los Angeles Galaxy. LA Galaxy won 4–1 in front of 31,853 spectators, the largest crowd for non-national football (soccer) match in New Zealand history.

On 17 January 2008, the stadium hosted the kickoff show of the Oceania leg of The Police Reunion Tour and over Easter the inaugural two-day "Rock2Wgtn" music festival, headlined by Kiss and Ozzy Osbourne. Attendance over the two days was around 50,000.

New Zealand hosted the 2008 FIFA U-17 Women's World Cup. Six pool matches and two playoff matches were played at the then Westpac Stadium. Due to FIFA rules disallowing host stadia to be named after non-FIFA sponsors, the stadium was officially known as "Wellington Stadium" during the event.

The stadium hosted the national team's 2010 FIFA World Cup qualifying match on 14 November 2009 against Bahrain. New Zealand won the match 1–0, with a record crowd at the time of 35,194 for a football match in New Zealand.

On 28 January 2010, AC/DC kicked off the Australasian leg of its Black Ice World Tour at the stadium. The concert quickly sold out so a second was scheduled for 30 January. The stadium was also a venue for Bon Jovi's The Circle Tour in 2010.

The stadium hosted eight games during the 2011 Rugby World Cup including two quarter-final matches.

On 25 April 2013, the stadium hosted the first AFL game outside of Australia for premiership points with  hosting  with Sydney winning by 16 points in front of 22,546 spectators.

On 11 May 2013, the stadium and Wellington hosted its first National Rugby League fixture since 2004 with the Auckland-based New Zealand Warriors hosting the Canterbury-Bankstown Bulldogs at the stadium for 'The Capital Clash'. The Warriors wore their 'Capital Clash' jerseys which incorporated the black and gold colours of Wellington and a design based on a strip worn by Wellington Rugby league teams in the 1970s. The Warriors lost the game late in the match in front of 28,096 fans.

On 20 November 2013, the stadium hosted the second leg of the World Cup qualification inter-confederation play-off against Mexico, which resulted in New Zealand failing to qualify for the 2014 FIFA World Cup.

On 15 November 2014, the stadium hosted the 2014 Rugby League Four Nations Final. It was the first Four Nations Final held in New Zealand, though the Mount Smart Stadium in Auckland hosted the inaugural final of the tournament, then known as the Tri-Nations, in 1999.

The stadium was one of the venues for 2015 Cricket World Cup which was co-hosted by New Zealand and Australia. It hosted a total of four matches during the World Cup which included a quarter-final clash between the hosts New Zealand and West Indies.

Guns N' Roses performed at the stadium during their Not In This Lifetime...Tour on February 2, 2017.

On 11 November 2017, the stadium hosted its third World Cup qualification inter-confederation play-off with the New Zealand national football team drawing 0–0 against Peru in front of a new record crowd for a football match in New Zealand of 37,034 fans thanks to extra seating install in the stadium for the match.

On 2 March 2019, the stadium drew its largest crowd to date with an attendance record of 46,474 for Eminem's Rapture 2019 concert.

On 5 February 2020, Queen + Adam Lambert performed at the stadium during their Rhapsody Tour.

On 8 December 2022, Guns N' Roses will perform at the stadium during their 2020 Tour, followed up by the Foo Fighters a week later on the 15 December (the latter was cancelled after the death of Foo Fighters' drummer Taylor Hawkins).

The stadium will host several matches for the 2023 FIFA Women's World Cup.

Major tournaments

Reference:

Reference:

Rugby League Test Matches
Since its opening in 2000, Wellington Regional Stadium has hosted six New Zealand rugby league internationals. The results were as follows;.

Gallery

See also
 Basin Reserve – Wellington's other international cricket ground

References

External links

Cricinfo Wellington Regional Stadium page

Sports venues in Wellington City
Rugby union stadiums in New Zealand
Association football venues in New Zealand
Cricket grounds in New Zealand
Music venues in New Zealand
Rugby league stadiums in New Zealand
Wellington Phoenix FC
Wellington Rugby Football Union
Music venues completed in 1999
Sports venues completed in 1999
Hurricanes (rugby union)
A-League Men stadiums
A-League Women stadiums
Defunct Australian Football League grounds
1990s architecture in New Zealand
1999 establishments in New Zealand
2015 Cricket World Cup stadiums
World Rugby Sevens Series venues
2023 FIFA Women's World Cup stadiums